Sedum sarmentosum, known as stringy stonecrop, gold moss stonecrop, and graveyard moss, is a perennial flowering plant in the family Crassulaceae native to East Asia (China and Korea) and Southeast Asia (Thailand).  It has been introduced in at least eastern North America, and Europe.

Description
Sedum sarmentosum has succulent, evergreen leaves atop arching, low-lying stems. Yellow flowers with five petals arise on inflorescences during the summer.

Cultivation
Sedum sarmentosum is cultivated as a perennial groundcover in temperate climates. Like most succulents, it is tolerant of drought and full sun conditions. It was commonly planted at graves, where it may persist for decades. In China, it is often cultivated as a trailing plant, hence the name chui pen cao (垂盆草) which means "the herb that trails down the flowerpot".

Culinary use
In Korea, the plant is called dolnamul and is eaten fresh as a namul vegetable. The spicy, sweet, and tangy sauce typically served with dolnamul can be made by mixing gochujang, vinegar (or lemon juice), sugar (or plum syrup), minced garlic, sesame oil, and toasted sesame seeds. Dolnamul is also a common ingredient in bibimbap, as well as Korean-style western food such as dolnamul and roasted fruit salad with yuja dressing.

References

External links
 
 

Korean vegetables
Namul
sarmentosum
Taxa named by Alexander von Bunge